Conservatism in South Korea is chiefly associated with the People Power Party. Traditional South Korean conservatism is a political and social philosophy characterized by Korean culture traditions originating from Confucianism. South Korean conservative parties largely believe in stances such as a developmental state, pro-business, opposition to labor unions, strong national defense, anti-communism, pro-communitarianism, pro-US-KR relations and recently free trade and neoliberalism.

Starting from the dictatorship of Syngman Rhee, South Korean conservatism has been influenced from the military dictatorships of Park Chung-hee and Chun Doo-hwan. In domestic policy, South Korean conservatism has a strong elitist streak and promotes rapid modernization and social stability. However, since the mid-to-late 2010s, conservatives with populist tendencies have become more prominent in the public sphere.

Unlike conservatives in the United States, conservatives in South Korea often define themselves as "liberals". However both groups fervently denounce socialism and refer to themselves "anti-socialist". However, they are distinct from the general "liberal" in South Korea.

Values

Domestic issues 
South Korea's conservative philosophy is derived in part from the traditional East Asian values of communitarianism and Confucian social conservatism, along with modern influences such as economic neoliberalism, leading to support for economic liberalism and opposition to welfare states. However, given the influence of the Park Chung-hee era on conservative's thinking, they also advocate for certain forms of economic interventionism which they think critical to maintain this system.

They are also more likely to support upholding the National Security Act. Because of this, conservatives are less likely to solely prioritise ethnic nationalism, with their nationalism being a mixture of it with civic nationalism. Nonetheless, conservatives are less receptive to multiculturalism than liberals. Modern conservatives are generally against LGBT rights and activism.

The anti-communist tendencies of South Korean conservatives has led to perceptions by progressives and liberals that conservatives foster McCarthyist-like red scares among the public. This includes an incident before the 1996 Legislative elections, where conservative lawmakers were arrested for secretly meeting with North Korean agents in Beijing to seek North's help in manipulating the outcome of the election in exchange for payoffs. The North fired artillery into the Join Security Zone on the DMZ, which caused panic among South Korean electorates, benefiting the conservative party.

International issues 
Conservatism in South Korea is fervently anti-communist. South Korean conservatives oppose warming relations with North Korea, and therefore wish to strengthen the US-ROK alliance in order to improve South Korean security, in contrast to South Korean progressives who prefer détente with North Korea through the Sunshine Policy along with either maintaining the US-ROK alliance as is or softening it. However, there is a split between moderates and hardliners among conservatives, with the former emphasising issues related to North Korean defectors and identifying themselves as liberals, while the latter takes up the traditional aggressive emphasis on anti-communism and pro-Americanism.

History 
Before democratisation in 1987, South Korean conservatives were characterised not only by anti-communism, but also authoritarianism and "developmentalism". After 1987, there was a trend in conservatism towards rebranding as the New Right and focusing on economic neoliberalism. In addition, conservatives adapted to the new democratic environment by increasing the number of conservative activist groups and online presence.

Following 1987, the South Korean public became less interested in issues such as class and politics than in the past, and thus, overall, both progressives and conservatives shifted their messaging; the former shifted from radical politics to supporting the likes of social democracy and welfare expansion, whereas the latter emphasised neoliberal values such as "freedom, capabilities, and competition of individuals".

The large city of Daegu, although a site of radical politics in the earlier postwar era, was transformed under the rule of Daegu-born Park Chung-hee and today has been called a "citadel of conservatism" in South Korea. The southeastern region of the country, once collectively known as Gyeongsang, is where Daegu is found and this entire region is known for being particularly conservative, as can be seen in modern election results.

Following the success of Lee Myung-bak in the 2007 presidential election, some viewed it as a return to conservatism in South Korea after a decade of rule under progressive presidents, although an analysis by David C. Kang let him to argue that it was a turn towards centrism among the populace, given Lee's pragmatic business-minded tendencies, rather than traditional "arch-conservatism" of candidate Lee Hoi-chang. For instance, Lee pursued a more constructive and realistic foreign policy relationship with China in contrast to what more strident anti-communists would prefer, indicating the modern unpracticality of demonising China, even among conservative heads of state. During the campaigning seasons, Lee's aides also worked to present his approach as being "neither left nor right".

Jeong Tae-heon, a professor of Korean history at Korea University has expressed concerns that disputes over the term Jayuminjujuui reflect a strong conservative bias reacting against North Korea's political ideologies, similar to political views seen in 1950. The term liberal democracy as used by South Korean conservatives has a different connotation than in the Anglosphere, as its reflects the anti-communism and state-guided economic develop of the pre-1987 era.

In 2020, People Power Party (South Korea)'s leader Kim Chong-in apologized for the Gwangju Democratization Movement. But some conservative citizen groups such as the Korean Council for Restoration National Identity and American and Korean Friendship National Council protested at UNESCO headquarters in Paris in May 2011 to prevent inscribing the records of the Gwangju Democratization Movement in the Memory of the World Register, and to petition for "reconsidering identifying North Korean Special Forces as the perpetrators of the GDM.

Conservative parties
The political party that once were ruling party are in bold. KIP is the exception for being a ruling party during Provisional Governmental era.

Mainstream parties
 National Alliance for the Rapid Realization of Korean Independence (1946–1958; Governing period: 1948–1950)
 Korea Nationalist Party (1948–1958; Governing years: 1950–1954)
 Liberal Party (1951–1970; Governing period: 1954–1960)
 Democratic Republican Party (1963–1980)
 Korean National Party → New Democratic Republican Party (1980–1990)
 Democratic Justice Party (1980–1990 also as governing period)
 Democratic Liberal Party → New Korea Party (1990–1997)
 United Liberal Democrats (1992–2006)
Grand National Party → Saenuri Party → Liberty Korea Party (1997–2020; Governing period: 2007–2017)
 Liberty Forward Party → Advancement Unification Party (2006–2012)
 Pro-Park Coalition → Future Hope Alliance (2007–2012) 
 Bareun Party (2016–2018)
 Bareunmirae Party (2018–2020)
 New Conservative Party (2020)
 United Future Party → People Power Party (since 2020; Governing period: 2022-present)
 Future Korea Party (satellite party for the 2020 election)

Minor parties
 Korea Independence Party (1928–1970)
 Korean National Youth Association (1946-1949)
 Federation Korean National Independence (1947–1951)
 Korea National Party (1947–1958)
 Conservative Party (1963)
 Righteous Citizens Party → Justice Party (1963–1967)
 New People's Association → People's Party (1963–1971)
 New Political Reform Party (1992)
 United People's Party → Democratic Party (1992–1995) 
 Democratic Republican Party (1997–2009)
 New Korea Party of Hope (2000–2001)
 National Integration 21 (2004)
 People First Party (2005–2008)
 Pro-Park United (2006–2012)
 Party of Future Union (2010–2012)
 Go! Party for the Grand People (2011–2012)
 Korea Vision Party (2012)
 Hannara Party (2012–2016)
 Chinbak Yeondae (since 2012)
 Let's Go! Korea (since 2012)
 Republican Party (2014–2020)
 Patriotic Party → United Korean Party → New National Participation Party (since 2015)
 Korean National Party (2016–2020)
 Pro-Ban Unification Party → Korea Economic Party → Free Korea 21 → Liberty and Democracy Party (since 2016)
 Saenuri Party (since 2017)
 New Korean Peninsula Party (since 2017)
 Dawn of Liberty Party (since 2019)
 People Party (2020–2022)
 Our Republican Party (since 2020)
 Pro-Park New Party (since 2020)
 Liberal Party (since 2020)
 Future of Chungcheong Province Party (since 2020)

Conservative media in South Korea
The Chojoongdong media cartel wields the largest political influence in the South Korean political scene through newspaper and other print publications. The three media cartels have been criticized for fabricating stories against North Korea to support conservative rhetoric.

 Chosun Ilbo – right-wing, anti-communist and conservative
 TV Chosun (broadcasting)
 Dong-a Ilbo – right-wing, conservative
 Channel A (broadcasting)
 JoongAng Ilbo – centre-right, moderate conservative and pro-Chaebol
 Korea JoongAng Daily (English-language newspapers)
 JTBC (broadcasting)
 Korea Economic Daily – pro-business and conservative
 Kukmin Ilbo – centrist, Christian values
 Maeil Business Newspaper – pro-business
 Munhwa Ilbo – right-wing, conservative and pro-Chaebol
 Segye Ilbo - right-wing, pro-Unification Church

Conservative presidents
 Rhee Syng-man (Liberal Party, 1948–1960)
 Park Chung-hee (Military junta/Democratic Republican Party, 1962–1979)
 Chun Doo-hwan (Military junta/Democratic Justice Party, 1980–1988)
 Roh Tae-woo (Democratic Justice Party→Democratic Liberal Party, 1988–1993)
 Kim Young-sam (Democratic Liberal Party→New Korea Party→Grand National Party, 1993–1998)
 Lee Myung-bak (Grand National Party→Saenuri Party, 2008–2013)
 Park Geun-hye (Saenuri Party→Liberty Korea Party, 2013–2017)
 Yoon Suk-yeol (People Power Party, 2022–present)

Major conservative parties election results of South Korea

General elections

Local elections

See also
Conservative political parties in South Korea 
 Economic liberalism
 Economic interventionism
 Neo-Confucianism
 New Right (South Korea)
 Liberalism in South Korea
 Liberal conservatism (centre to centre-right)
 October Restoration
 One-People Principle
 Progressivism in South Korea
 Sadaejuui (factions)
 Social conservatism

References

External links
Review of the 60 years of Korean Conservatism ― Tasks in Leading National Advancement, by Park Hyo-chong
보수세력이 친일파 되살리는 까닭은? (Why does the Korean Conservative political camp want to bring back the Chinilpa scene?) – relating to the Korean Broadcasting System's controversial documentaries 

 
Anti-North Korean sentiment in South Korea
Korean Confucianism
Nationalism in South Korea
Political history of South Korea